Paul Ortiz may refer to:

 Paul Ortiz (historian) (born 1964), history professor and author
 Paul Ortiz (musician), multi-instrumentalist